Mahasarakham SBT Football Club (Thai สโมสรฟุตบอลมหาสารคาม เอสบีที), is a Thai football club based in Mahasarakham, Thailand. They currently play in Thai League 3 Northeastern region.

Timeline
History of events Mahasarakham City Football Club

Stadium and locations

Season by season record

P = Played
W = Games won
D = Games drawn
L = Games lost
F = Goals for
A = Goals against
Pts = Points
Pos = Final position

QR1 = First Qualifying Round
QR2 = Second Qualifying Round
R1 = Round 1
R2 = Round 2
R3 = Round 3
R4 = Round 4

R5 = Round 5
R6 = Round 6
QF = Quarter-finals
SF = Semi-finals
RU = Runners-up
W = Winners

Honours

Domestic leagues
 Thai League 3 North Eastern Region
 Winners (1): 2022–23

Players

Current squad

Club staff

References

External links
 Official Facebookpage of Mahasarakham United FC

Football clubs in Thailand
Association football clubs established in 2009
Maha Sarakham province
2009 establishments in Thailand
Sport in Maha Sarakham province